Emilio Gómez Gallardo (born 14 January 1958), commonly known as Emilio, is a Spanish retired footballer who played as a midfielder, and is a manager.

Club career
Emilio started his career with the youth ranks of FC Barcelona, playing for the club's 'B' team in the 1976–77 Segunda División, before spending a season with fellow second division side Gimnàstic de Tarragona. In 1980, Emilio moved to Celta de Vigo, at the time also playing in the second division, before winning promotion to La Liga in the 1981–82 season.

International career
Emilio represented the Spain under-20 side at the 1977 FIFA World Youth Championship in Tunisia, featuring in one game.

References

External links

1958 births
Living people
Spanish footballers
Spain youth international footballers
Association football midfielders
La Liga players
Segunda División players
FC Barcelona players
RC Celta de Vigo players
FC Andorra players
Gimnàstic de Tarragona footballers
Spanish football managers
FC Andorra managers